Qatargas is the world's largest liquefied natural gas (LNG) company. It produces and supplies the globe with 77 million metric tonnes of LNG annually from across its seven ventures—Qatargas 1, Qatargas 2, Qatargas 3, Qatargas 4, RL1, RL2 and RL3. It is headquartered in Doha, Qatar, and maintains its upstream assets in Ras Laffan, Qatar. Natural gas is supplied to Qatargas's LNG trains from Qatar's North Field, by far the world's largest non-associated gas field. It reached a record LNG production of 77 million tonnes per year in December 2010.

History
Qatargas (Qatargas Liquefied Gas Company Limited) was established in 1984 as a joint venture between QatarEnergy, ExxonMobil and other partners. In the following years the company began developing the North Field and erected the first three LNG trains (Train 1, 2 and 3) with a design capacity of 3.3 million tonnes per year each. The trains were built in 1996, 1997 and 1998 respectively.

The company executed the first two major sales and purchase agreements with eight Japanese customers in 1992 and 1994, the company Chubu Electric Power being the largest. The contract guaranteed the delivery of 4 million tonnes of LNG per year to Chubu Electric and six million tonnes per year over a 25-year period for the eight customers.

In 1993 Ras Laffan Liquefied Natural Gas Company was established as a subsidiary for the operation and maintenance of LNG and Helium production, and also operates as a subsidiary of QatarEnergy, based in Doha. The official foundation stone for Qatargas 1 was laid in 1994 and in 1995 another major contract with the Korea Gas Corporation (KOGAS) was signed, guaranteeing the supply of 2.4 million tonnes of LNG per year. Also, in 1995, the first offshore drilling operations were begun. In 1996 LNG production began. The first LNG carrier named Al Zubara was delivered to Qatargas in 1996. The first shipment of LNG was loaded and delivered to Japan in 1996 and Spain (Enagás) in 1997 from Ras Laffan Industrial City's port. In the same year, 1997, the then Emir Hamad bin Khalifa Al Thani inaugurated the Qatargas 1 LNG plant and facilities and the first sulfur plant launched operation (Sulfur Plant 1). 2000 marked 10 million tonnes of LNG delivered to Japan since shipment commencement in 1996.

Ras Laffan Liquefied Natural Gas Company II (RL II) and RasGas Company Ltd. were established in 2001 to operate the LNG trains and associated facilities, also located in Ras Laffan Industrial City. In the same year a 25-year contract with Edison Gas was signed. In 2002 a contract was signed with BP, for the delivery of 750,000 tonnes of LNG per year to Spain. The first shipment was scheduled for the third quarter of 2003 and the British Merchant, a BP-operated LNG vessel, was assigned to carry shipments over a three-year period. In the same year QatarEnergy signed an agreement with ExxonMobil for the construction of two additional LNG trains (Train 4 and 5), forming the "Qatargas 2" joint-venture. Exxon and other partners invested around $12.8 billion into the joint-venture. The foundation stone was laid in February 2005.

In 2003, a joint venture for the Ras Laffan helium project was formed. It produced the first helium in August 2005. Qatargas 3 was formed in the same year between QatarEnergy and ConocoPhillips. Another Head of Agreement between QatarEnergy and RL (II) to supply 15.6 Mta of LNG to the USA was signed in 2003. RasGas also began to build and operate the first phase of the Al Khaleej Gas project ("AK-1" or "AKG-1") for domestic gas supply on behalf of QatarEnergy and ExxonMobil Middle East Gas Marketing. In 2004 the first dedicated LNG vessel Fuwairit was delivered to RL (II), and in 2005 AK-1 was inaugurated and started, as well as Ras Laffan Liquefied Natural Gas Company Limited (III) (RLIII) established, which owns RasGas' trains 6 and 7, the company's first mega-trains. Another agreement between Shell and Qatargas was made to erect Qatargas 4 ("QG4").

Qatargas Operating Company Limited was formed in July 2005 for the purpose of constructions  of Qatargas 2, Qatargas 3, Qatargas 4, Laffan Refinery and other assets on behalf of the shareholders. Qatargas also announced a moratorium on further development of the North Field in 2005, and ordered further studies and a review of the field, which were expected to end in 2010. The moratorium was initially expected to remain in place until 2013 or 2014 but was lifted in 2017. In 2006 the construction for QG3 and QG4 started and RasGas' Train 5 was erected. The train was inaugurated in 2007 as well as the first Q-Max LNG carrier "Al Dafna" floated out of its dry dock (delivered in 2009) and the first Q-Flex ship delivered to Qatargas.

In 2008 two major SPAs were signed with PetroChina, for 3 million tonnes per year over 25-years, and 2 million tonnes per year over 25 years with China National Offshore Oil Corporation (CNOOC) with the deal totaling around 2 million tonnes per year. It was to begin in October 2009. Another 10-year contract was signed between Qatargas and TT, ordering 1 million tons of LNG a year, starting in 2011. Ras Laffan Helium 1 reached its full production capacity in 2008 and the first LNG shipment to the west coast of North America was completed. As well the first Q-Flex vessel transited the Suez Canal.

Several other LNG deliveries to Italy (Adriatic LNG), Mexico (Altamira), China (CNOOC), Canada (Canaport LNG), the United Kingdom (South Hook) and the United States (Golden Pass) followed in 2009 and new SPAs were signed, like the long-term SPA with PGNiG of Poland. The SPA detailed 1 million tonnes per year over 20 years, with the first delivery being made in 2015. On April 6, 2009, the Qatargas 2 project was officially inaugurated with two mega trains of 7.8 million tonnes per year each. That same year phase 2 of the Al Khaleej Gas project was launched.

Following the international economic crisis and the downturn of gas and oil prices in 2008, Qatargas temporarily had to declare force majeure in January 2009 on production of three LNG trains. The company remained on track with its other projects and its general direction. In November 2010 and January 2011, respectively, qatargas 3 and 4 started production.  In December 2010, Qatar celebrated achieving the national goal of 77 million tonnes per year for the first time, making it the world's largest LNG producer.

Because of the major advances in oil- and gas extracting techniques (shale - or tight gas from rock, oil sands) Qatargas had to make adjustments in its corporate strategy.

Whilst the company initially aimed at European customers and the United States, the increasing production from North America made it necessary focus on Asian markets, with Japan currently importing around 15% of its total gas consumption from Qatargas, and China, India and South Korea being other major customers.

In 2010 the Ras Laffan Helium 2 project was also announced, Train 6 began production (adding 7.8 million tonnes per year) and the Laffan Refinery was inaugurated by Al-Thani.
Another deal with Respol (Canada) was signed in the same year. Qatargas agreed to deliver the LNG to Canaport using both Q-Flex and Q-Max vessels, each holding the equivalent of approximately 5.6 and 4.6 billion cubic feet of natural gas, respectively. Further major deliveries were made to Dubai and France and in 2010 further talks with the United Kingdom were initiated and a Heads on Agreement was signed. In June 2011 Qatargas then signed a three-year LNG deal with Centrica (UK), valued at around $3.24 billion at the time. The contract has since then been extended to a four-and-a-half-year contract in June 2014 and the latest contract extending the partnership until December 2023. Centrica had originally tried to seal a 20-year contract.

Qatargas also signed a long-term agreement in 2011 for over 1 million tonnes per year with Malaysia's Petronas, expiring in 2018, which has since been extended until December 2023. Qatargas' Train 7 began production in 2011 (7.8 million tonnes per year) and the Map Ta Phut LNG Terminal was commissioned by Qatargas that same year. In the following year, 2012, Qatargas 1 signed a long-term contract with Tokyo Electric Power Company for over 1 million tonnes per year of LNG.
Qatargas 3 signed SPAs with PTT of Thailand, Japan's Kanasai and Chubu Electric Power in 2012.

In 2013 the Ras Laffan Helium 2 plant was inaugurated and produced its first helium that same year. The plant is the largest of its kind in the world and made Qatar the world's largest helium exporter.
In 2014 the construction for Laffan Refinery 2 began and the refinery delivered the first Diesel Hydrotreater (DHT). The Procurement and Construction contract (EPC) for the DHT with Samsung Engineering had been signed in 2012. The first ship-to-ship transfer (STS) of LNG, following an incident with one of Qatargas' leased vessels in the straights of Singapore, was carried out in 2014. Also, in 2014, Qatargas announced the successful start-up of the Jetty Boil-off Gas Recovery Project, which aimed to reduce flaring at the Ras Laffan LNG loading berths and was inaugurated in 2015.

2015 saw the 5000th LNG cargo loaded at Ras Laffan Port, 2300 of them having been shipped to Japanese customers, as well as the sale of the first LNG to the Kingdom of Jordan and the first delivery of LNG to Pakistan State Oil Company made in 2016. The 10,000 LNG vessel was loaded at Ras Laffan Port in 2016 and the Laffan Refinery 2 started operations with a refining capacity of 146,000 barrels of condensate per day. It was officially inaugurated by Al-Thani in 2017. In June 2017 Qatargas had to shut down operations of Helium 1 and Helium 2, due to the economic boycott, which was imposed on Qatar by other Arab States. Following other major companies like ARAMCO, the preparation and integration of the merger of state-owned companies Qatargas and RasGas, which had been announced in December 2016, was completed in 2017. Qatargas delivered 1.5 million tonnes per year and signed a new SPA with Turkey's Boas, to deliver 1.5 million tonnes per year of LNG for three years, beginning in October 2017. Another deal with Royal Dutch Shell to deliver up to 1.1 million tonnes per year of LNG for five years was also signed as well.

It aimed to "[…] create a truly unique global energy operator in terms of size, service and reliability" and to "[…] confirm and restrengthen QatarEnergy's superiority in the LNG business [by] reducing operating costs", stated the QatarEnergy's president and CEO Saad al-Kaabi. The merger of Qatargas and RasGas became operative on 1 January 2018, marking the beginning for a "new" Qatargas and securing its rank as largest LNG producer worldwide. Al-Kaabi gave a press conference on 4 January 2018, stating that the new company would save around $550 million in operating costs per year.

Sheikh Khalid Bin Khalifa Al Thani was appointed CEO for the new Qatargas.

Operations
The shareholders of the Qatargas 1 are QatarEnergy, ExxonMobil, TotalEnergies, Mitsui and Marubeni. It owns three LNG trains. In 2008, it produced 10.09 million tonnes of liquefied natural gas. The projected production for the end of 2012 was 42 million tonnes per year.

Qatargas II, a joint venture of QatarEnergy and ExxonMobil, owns LNG trains 4 and 5 with a capacity of 7.8 million tonnes per year each. It is supplying LNG for the South Hook LNG terminal at Milford Haven, Pembrokeshire, Wales, from where gas is fed to the South Wales Gas Pipeline. This covers 20% of the United Kingdom's needs of LNG.

Qatargas III is a joint venture between QatarEnergy, ConocoPhillips and Mitsui. Qatargas IV is a joint venture between QatarEnergy and Shell. At first approached as separate projects, Qatargas III and IV are now being built by a joint asset development team that is staffed by Qatargas, ConocoPhillips and Shell employees as well as project direct hires and short term contractors. Its trains have started up by end 2010 (QG3) and early 2011 (QG4).

The production facilities were commissioned in 1996. Processed gas is transferred to shore with the associated condensate via a single  subsea pipeline.

Qatargas transports its LNG by using two classes of LNG tankers known as Q-Max and Q-Flex.

At present Qatar Energy is spending almost $30bn in expanding its North Field, to raise its annual production capacity from 77m tonnes of LNG to 110m by 2025. A second phase is expected to increase it to 126m tonnes by 2027.

See also

 Qatargas League

References

External links
 Company website

Oil and gas companies of Qatar
Liquefied natural gas plants
Energy companies established in 1984
Non-renewable resource companies established in 1984
Qatari companies established in 1984